Tranebergs IF was a professional ice hockey team based in Traneberg, Sweden. Founded in 1912, the team played in within the Swedish Divisions 1 and 2 until 1975.  The team, whose colours were navy blue, red and white, was a steady competitor in Sweden's highest league from the 1920s to the 1950s, and was a semi-finalist in 1935.

External links
Tranebergs IF at Elite Prospects

Defunct ice hockey teams in Sweden
Ice hockey clubs established in 1912
1912 establishments in Sweden
Ice hockey clubs disestablished in 1975
1975 disestablishments in Sweden